Kabaw, Kabao or Cabao is a town in the Nalut District in northwestern Libya.

History
Historically, Kabaw was a Berber town in the Ghadames administrative area. After World War II, it was occupied by the French military and governed from Tunisia. It was returned to Libyan control in 1951.

Attractions
Kabaw is home to the ghurfas or "Ksar Kabaw" a Berber hilltop village-fort, now abandoned. The  ghurfas is built mainly of rock, gypsum and adobe, with doors made of palm wood.

The Spring Qsar Festival is held in April almost every year.

Notes

External links
 "Kabaw Map — Satellite Images of Kabaw" Maplandia World Gazetteer

Populated places in Nalut District
Berber populated places
Baladiyat of Libya